Karen Smith (born 3 December 1970) is a retired female field hockey player from New Zealand. She was a member of the Women's National Team, nicknamed The Black Sticks, that won the bronze medal at the 1998 Commonwealth Games in Kuala Lumpur, Malaysia.

References
NZ Commonwealth Games

1970 births
Living people
New Zealand female field hockey players
Female field hockey goalkeepers
Commonwealth Games bronze medallists for New Zealand
Field hockey players at the 1998 Commonwealth Games
Commonwealth Games medallists in field hockey
Medallists at the 1998 Commonwealth Games